Sir Edmund Nuttall, 1st Baronet (29 May 1870 – 11 October 1923) was a British civil engineer, head of Edmund Nuttall Limited.

The company was founded by his father, James Nuttall, but its name was changed after his death.

He is buried at St Peter's Church, Petersham, along with his wife, Ethel Christine Nuttall (1871-1958).

References

1870 births
1923 deaths
Burials at St Peter's, Petersham
Edmund
Baronets in the Baronetage of the United Kingdom